Robert Hawkins is an engineering technologist and a former municipal and territorial level politician from Northwest Territories, Canada.

Early life
Hawkins moved to Fort Simpson, Northwest Territories in 1977 as a child. Hawkins moved to Yellowknife, Northwest Territories in 1987 to begin schooling at Sir John Franklin High School. He attended his post secondary education at SAIT Polytechnic in Calgary, Alberta. He began his political career when he was elected as a city councillor for Yellowknife City Council. He held that post until 2003 when he sought election to the territorial legislature.

Political career
Hawkins was first elected to the Northwest Territories Legislature winning the Yellowknife Centre electoral district in the 2003 Northwest Territories general election. He defeated 6 other candidates to take the sought after seat. In 2007, Hawkins pursued re-election and won again with almost 50% of the popular vote, and approximately 20% more than his closest competitor.  2007 Northwest Territories general election.

References

External links
Robert Hawkins Legislature biography
Robert Hawkins campaign homepage

Members of the Legislative Assembly of the Northwest Territories
Living people
Yellowknife city councillors
21st-century Canadian politicians
Year of birth missing (living people)